The Austin Sun was a biweekly counterculture newspaper, similar in nature to Rolling Stone during the latter's formative years, that was published in Austin, Texas, between 1974 and 1978.  It is notable for being the newspaper that started the careers of many persons who later became well known in journalism and other media. It was also a precursor to the LA Weekly, which commenced publication in 1978, and  The Austin Chronicle, which commenced publication in 1981.  Both the L.A. Weekly and the Austin Chronicle continue to publish.  Both also remain associated with persons who were originally with the Austin Sun.  The social and cultural impact of the Austin Sun is recognized through being indexed by the Library of Congress, as well as through ongoing reunion activities.

History

The paper was co-founded by Jeff Nightbyrd (formerly Jeff Shero), who had been the editor of The Rat in New York City and associated with The Rag underground newspaper in Austin. Nightbyrd established the paper with Michael Eakin, a former editor at the Daily Texan, the student newspaper of the University of Texas at Austin.  They were later joined by J. David Moriarty as managing editor, and considered to be the only person at the paper with business expertise.

The paper's first issue was published on October 17, 1974.  Its last issue was published on June 29, 1978.  Unlike underground newspapers, which published much counter-culture social and political commentary by way of volunteer submissions, the Austin Sun was intended to be a commercially viable enterprise, with formal advertising programs and paid staff positions.

Despite intentions in relation to commercial viability, most staff members of the Austin Sun needed to have full-time jobs elsewhere to provide for themselves. Jeff Nightbyrd regularly offered employees stock in lieu of salaries, though the stock, being printed paper in relation to a private company, bore no relationship to the actual value of the business.

The Austin Sun was instrumental in advancing the careers of many artists.  It is considered to be the first newspaper to advance to a wider audience the careers of Stevie Ray Vaughan, Joe Ely, Marcia Ball, and Butch Hancock, among others.  It also covered the first American performances of Elvis Costello, at the Armadillo World Headquarters, and the Sex Pistols, in San Antonio.

Following the cessation of publication of the Austin Sun in 1978, several of its writers relocated to Los Angeles, forming the core first editorial group of the L.A. Weekly,  which commenced publication that same year.  Some of those same writers became key contributors to The Austin Chronicle, when it commenced publication in 1981.  A reunion of Austin Sun staff members was held in October, 2009.  A website was established by former staff members Bill Hood and Deborah Stall Nelson, where former staff members and readers of the Austin Sun regularly share recollections and updates.

Protection of the Austin Sun name appears to have been lost, in that the name is currently used by an internet news site with no evident association with the original Austin Sun ownership.

2016 Relaunch
In June 2016, the Austin Sun was re-launched as a website in the spirit of the original publication. Founding Sun writers Bill Bentley, James BigBoy Medlin, and Michael Ventura are contributors to the new site, along with original art directors Dan Hubig and Carlene Brady.

References

External links
The Austin Sun Reunion
Austin Sun Photographs by J.R. Compton  Photographs from 1975-1976.
Austin Sun Reunion Photographs by J.R. Compton Reunion photographs, 2009.

Defunct newspapers published in Texas